Tau Nancie is a former Papua New Guinea international lawn bowler.

Bowls career
Nancie has represented Papua New Guinea at the Commonwealth Games in the fours at the 1990 Commonwealth Games.

He won a gold medal at the 1987 Asia Pacific Bowls Championships in the fours at Lae in his home country.

References

Living people
Bowls players at the 1990 Commonwealth Games
Papua New Guinean male bowls players
Year of birth missing (living people)